Fredrik Mossberg (25 February 1874 – 14 August 1950) was a Swedish sports shooter. He competed in two events at the 1908 Summer Olympics.

References

External links
 

1874 births
1950 deaths
Swedish male sport shooters
Olympic shooters of Sweden
Shooters at the 1908 Summer Olympics
Sportspeople from Gävleborg County